The 2013 Women's Lacrosse World Cup, the ninth World Cup played, is the pre-eminent international women's lacrosse tournament. The tournament was held at the Civic Recreation Complex in Oshawa, Ontario, Canada from July 10 through July 20, 2013.

Sponsoring organizations
The event was sponsored by the Federation of International Lacrosse (FIL) and the Ontario Trillium Foundation. The tournament was first held in 1982 and has been held quadrennially on odd years since 1989.

Teams
Nineteen teams, the most ever, competed in the 2013 World Cup tournament.  New entries included Finland, Hong Kong, Israel, South Korea, and Latvia. The Czech Republic and Denmark did not return from the 2009 World Cup.

Championship
Following Pool play, teams were seeded into a Championship Bracket of 12 teams and a Diamond Consolation Bracket of 7 teams. The Championship Bracket consisted of the teams in Pool A, the top 2 teams in Pools B, C and D and the next highest ranked team. The seven remaining teams were placed in the Diamond Consolation Bracket and re-seeded into two new pools, X and Y, based on rankings and teams previously played in the pool play.

The United States team dominated pool and bracket play, ending the tournament with a perfect 7-0 record.  USA faced Canada in the gold medal game and won with a final score of 19-5 to earn its seventh world title.  Australia and England faced each other in the bronze medal game, with Australia defeating England 12-6.

Pool Play
Teams are divided into four pools, A-D.  Pool play games will be played on July 11 through 16.

WPct. = Winning Percentage, GF = Goals For, GA = Goals Against, PPG= Points per Game

Pool A
All 5 teams guaranteed a berth into Championship Bracket, Top 4 receive Bye to Quarterfinal.

Pool B
Top 2 teams advance to Championship Bracket, 3rd place eligible based on record.

Pool C
Top 2 teams advance to Championship Bracket, 3rd place eligible based on record.  Austria advances as best of the 3rd place teams.

Pool D
Top 2 teams advance to Championship Bracket, 3rd place eligible based on record.

Diamond Consolation Bracket 
Pool X: 13th-15th Place
 17 July:
 Netherlands  11–10  Finland
 18 July:
 Germany  18–3  Finland
 19 July:
 Germany  21–2  Netherlands
Germany progresses to 12th place play-off game. Finland relegated to 15th place play-off game.

Pool Y: 16th-19th Place
 17 July:
 South Korea  23–7  Sweden
 Latvia  12–11  Hong Kong
 18 July:
 South Korea  23–7  Hong Kong
 Latvia  10–6  Sweden
 19 July:
 Hong Kong  15–5  Sweden
 South Korea  7–5  Latvia
South Korea progresses to 15th place play-off game.

Championship Bracket 
Round 1 (17 July)
 (8) Haudenosaunee  19–3  Ireland (9)
 (5) Wales  21–0  Austria (12)
 (11) Scotland  13–12  Japan (6)
 (10) Israel  12–9  New Zealand (7)

Quarterfinals (18 July)
 (1) United States  20–1  Haudenosaunee (8)
 (4) England  10–0  Wales (5)
 (3) Australia  26–2  Scotland (11)
 (2) Canada  17–5  Israel (10)

Semi-finals
1st-4th Place (19 July):
 (1) United States  21–8  England (4)
 (2) Canada  11–7  Australia (3)
5th-8th Place (19 July):
 (5) Wales  15–14  Haudenosaunee (8)
 (11) Scotland  9–7  Israel (10)
9th-12th Place (18 July):
 (9) Ireland  10–4  Austria (12)
 (6) Japan  23–4  New Zealand (7)

Finals 
15th-place match (19 July):
 South Korea  7–5  Finland
12th-place match (20 July):
 Germany  14–6  Austria (12)
11th-place match (19 July):
 (7) New Zealand  20–5  Austria (12)
9th-place match (20 July):
 (6) Japan  25–4  Ireland (9)
7th-place match (20 July):
 (8) Haudenosaunee  1–0*  Israel (10) (Israel forfeited.)
5th-place match (20 July):
 (5) Wales  8–4  Scotland (11)
Bronze-medal match (20 July):
 (3) Australia  12–6  England (4)
Gold-medal match (20 July):
 (1) United States  19–5  Canada (2)

Final rankings

All-World Team

External links 
 The 2013 FIL Women's World Cup web site
 Federation of International Lacrosse, WWC brackets
 LaxMagazine, 2012-13 Women's News

References

2013 Women's
2013 in lacrosse
2013
Women's Lacrosse
Lacrosse World Cup
Women's lacrosse in Canada